The Vickers 6-ton tank or Vickers Mark E, also known as the "Six-tonner" was a British light tank designed as a private project at Vickers. It was not adopted by the British Army, but was picked up by many foreign armed forces. It was licensed by the Soviet Union as the T-26. It was also the direct predecessor of the Polish 7TP tank.

History
The first Mark E was built in 1928 by a design team that included the famed tank designers John Valentine Carden and Vivian Loyd.

The Horstmann suspension used two axles, each of which carried a two-wheel bogie to which a second set of bogies was connected with a leaf spring. Upward movement of either set of bogies would force the other down through the spring. This was considered to be a fairly good system and offered better than normal cross-country performance although it could not compare with the contemporary Christie suspension.

The tank was built in two versions:
 Type A with two turrets, each mounting a Vickers machine gun.
 Type B with a single two-man turret mounting a single machine gun and a short-barreled 47 mm OQF 3-pdr gun.
The Type B proved to be a real innovation: it was found that the two-man turret dramatically increased the rate of fire of either weapon, while still allowing both to be fired at the same time. This design, which they referred to as a duplex mounting, became common on almost all tanks designed after the Mark E.

The British Army evaluated the Mark E, but rejected it, apparently due to questions about the reliability of the suspension. Vickers then started advertising the design to all buyers, and soon received a trickle of orders eventually including the USSR, Greece, Poland, Bolivia, Siam, Finland, Portugal, China and Bulgaria. Thailand purchased 36 Vickers Medium Dragon Mark IVs, and QF 2-pounder naval guns were added to turn them into self-propelled guns used in the 1940-41 Franco-Thai War. Vickers built a total of 153 (the most common figure) Mark Es.

Experience with the Polish machines showed that the engine tended to overheat due to poor airflow over the air-cooled engine. This was addressed by the addition of large air vents on either side of the hull. For a new Belgian order the design was modified to use the Rolls-Royce Phantom II water-cooled engine instead. This engine would not fit in the rear, and had to be mounted along the left side of the tank, requiring the turret to be moved to the right and rearward. One example of the resulting Mark F was tested by Belgium, but rejected. Nevertheless, the new hull was used, with the older engine, in the sales to Finland and Siam.

The Mark E was also developed as a cargo vehicle, and purchased by the British Army in small numbers as artillery tractors to haul their large BL 60-pounder field guns. Twelve were ordered by the Army as the Dragon, Medium Mark IV, while China purchased 23 and India 18.

Poland purchased 50, and also licensed it for the local production, but only put together 38 out of the 50, using the unassembled 12 for spare parts. The Poles modified their vehicles with larger air intakes, their own machine guns, 360-degree Gundlach periscopes, and five or more with added two-way radios, before deciding to make their own tank that would address the shortcomings of the original Vickers design. This resulted in the 7TP, which was nearly 10 tons in weight. The Poles also, besides the aforementioned telescope, added a liquid-cooled diesel engine as well as better armour protection, better ventilation, two-way radios, a  Polish version of the Bofors anti-tank gun, and a bigger crew compartment. Out of 38 original two-turreted tanks, 22 were later converted to single turret version with a modified turret and the  main gun (Type B standard). The tanks were in bad shape by 1939 because they were used in the training units over a period of five years. However, they did perform well and better than the Renault R35, amongst others, as part of the Polish 10. Cavalry Brigade during the Invasion of Poland in 1939.

The Soviets were also happy with the design and licensed it for production. However, in their case local production started as the T-26, and eventually over 12,000 were built in various versions. The Soviet early twin-turret T-26s had 7.62 mm (0.3 in) DT machine guns in each turret, or a mix of one machine gun turret and one 37 mm gun turret. Later, more common versions mounted a  gun and two DT machine guns. The final versions of the T-26 had welded construction and, eventually, sloped armour on the hull and turret. Because the T-26 was in such wide use and was a reliable platform, a variety of engineer vehicles were built on the chassis, including flamethrowers and bridgelayers. A novel radio-controlled demolition tank was built on the T-26 chassis also.

During the Spanish Civil War the Soviet Union sent the T-26 to the Republican Army. The Italians, after suffering losses from Republican T-26s during the battle of Guadalajara (1937), captured some of these tanks which served as models for their M11/39 and M13/40 medium tanks.

In 1939, during the Soviet-Finnish Winter War, the Finnish armoured forces consisted of around thirty-two obsolete Renault FT tanks, some Vickers-Carden-Lloyd Mk. IVs and Model 33s, which were equipped with machine guns, and 26 Vickers Armstrongs 6-ton tanks. The latter had been re-equipped with 37 mm Bofors AT-guns after the outbreak of the war. Only 13 of these tanks managed to get to the front in time to participate in the battles.

At the Battle of Honkaniemi on 26 February 1940, the Finns employed their Vickers tanks for the first – and only – time against Soviet armour during the Winter War. The results were disastrous. Of the thirteen available Finnish Vickers 6-ton tanks only six were in fighting condition and able to participate in the first assault on the Soviet lines – to make matters worse, one of the tanks was forced to stop, unable to cross a wide trench. The remaining five continued onwards a few hundred metres but ran into dozens of Soviet tanks in the village of Honkaniemi. The Finnish tanks managed to knock out three Soviet tanks but were soon themselves knocked-out. In the skirmishes that followed, the Finns lost two more Vickers tanks.

In 1941, the Finns rearmed their Vickers 6-ton tanks with Soviet 45 mm guns and re-designated them as T-26Es. These tanks were used by the Finnish Army during the Continuation War. Nineteen rebuilt Vickers tanks, along with 75 T-26s continued in Finnish service after the end of the Second World War. Some of these tanks were kept as training tanks until 1959, when they were finally phased out and replaced by newer British and Soviet tanks.

Operators
 – used one twin-turret tank Type A and two single-turret tanks Type B. The Bolivian Vickers tanks were the first to see combat service, also the first tanks to see combat in the Americas—in 1933 they were used in the Chaco War against Paraguay. All of them were destroyed or captured by Paraguayan forces. See Tank warfare in the Chaco War.
 – bought eight single-turret Mk.E Type B tanks, used by the 3rd Armoured Company.

 Republic of China – used 20 single-turret tanks Vickers Mk.E Type B. They were used in combat against the Japanese in Shanghai in 1937.
 – used 33 tanks since 1938 (including an evaluation tank). They were bought unarmed, without optics and radios. Some were armed with short-barreled 37 mm Puteaux guns and later equipped with 37 mm Bofors anti-tank guns as their main gun with a coaxial turret MG and a "tank SMG" in bow plate. They were used in the Winter War with the USSR. After this war, the Finns rearmed Mark E tanks with captured Soviet long 45 mm guns and DT MGs as used in the T-26. The Finns designated the rebuilt Vickers tanks logically as: T-26Es. They were used in combat from 1941 to 1944 and remained in service as training tanks until 1959.
 – captured from Poland, some converted to self-propelled guns.
 – one Type A and one Type B for tests, acquired in 1931. Along with two Carden-Loyd tankettes formed the first armoured battalion of the Hellenic Army, but were mostly used for training.
 – the Italians, after suffering losses from Republican T-26s during the Battle of Guadalajara, captured some of these tanks which served as models for their M11/39 and M13/40 light and medium tanks.
 – The Imperial Japanese Army imported one Type A tank to research in 1930. The Imperial Japanese Army evaluated the design and developed the Type 95 Ha-Go.
 – One double-turret Vickers Mk.E Type A tank captured from Bolivia, later used as monument, returned to Bolivia in 1994.

 – used 38 tanks since 1932: 22 Type B and 16 Type A tanks. Polish tanks had large air intakes behind the crew compartments as a significant feature. Poland also bought a license and developed an own improved model 7TP. Vickers Mk.E (Vickers E) tanks fought in the invasion of Poland.
 – two tanks for tests
 – the first buyer of Vickers Mk.E tanks. In 1931 bought 15 twin-turret tanks Mk.E Type A, and a license. The Soviets next started building and developing own improved tanks T-26 (about 12 000 made).
 – one ex-Bolivian single-turret Vickers Mk.E Type B tank bought from Paraguay, and a number of Soviet-made T-26s.
 (formerly Siam) – used 30 Vickers Mk.E Type Bs, which saw combat during the French-Thai War in French Indochina.

 – used 16 Type A tanks since 1940.
 – used four tanks for training
 – at least 19 captured from the Red Army

See also

List of tanks

Comparable vehicles

Note: Vehicles armed with machine guns are only comparable to the "A" variant.

 Germany: Panzer I • Panzer 35(t)
 Italy: L3/33 • L3/35
 Japan: Type 94
 Poland: TK-3 • TKS • 7TP
 Romania: R-1 • R-2
 Soviet Union: T-26 • T-27 • T-37A • T-38
 Sweden: Strv m/37

Notes

References

External links

 
 Canadian Army Early History section

Light tanks of the interwar period
World War II light tanks
Interwar tanks of the United Kingdom
World War II tanks of the United Kingdom
6-ton
Multi-turreted tanks
Military vehicles introduced in the 1920s
History of the tank